Buffalo Creek Reservoir is a reservoir near West Milford in Harrison County, West Virginia, United States. The reservoir is formed by an impoundment on Buffalo Creek, a tributary stream of the West Fork River.

References

Bodies of water of Harrison County, West Virginia
Reservoirs in West Virginia